The Madison County Courthouse is the courthouse in Madisonville, Texas.

The current structure was built in 1969. It is at least the fifth courthouse to serve Madison County.

In 2013, it was listed in "Five Of The Ugliest Texas County Courthouses" by Houstonia magazine.

See also

List of county courthouses in Texas

References

Buildings and structures in Madison County, Texas
County courthouses in Texas